Elibelinde (Turkish for "hands on hips") is a Turkish motif of a hands-on-hips female figure. It is widely used on kilims (flat tapestry-woven carpets) and occurs in many variations. The arms of the figure are represented by two inward-facing hooks, while the body of the woman is represented by a triangle or diamond. The head is typically represented by a diamond. The Elibelinde is a symbol of fertility and motherhood. It is one of many kilim motifs commonly woven into Turkish flatweave rugs.

References

Turkish rugs and carpets